The 2017 Kunming Open was a professional tennis tournament played on outdoor clay courts. It was the sixth (ATP) and fourth (ITF) editions of the tournament and part of the 2017 ATP Challenger Tour and the 2017 ITF Women's Circuit, offering $150,000+H (ATP) and $100,000+H (ITF) in prize money. It took place in Anning, China, from 24–30 April 2017.

Point distribution

Men's singles main draw entrants

Seeds 

 1 Rankings as of 17 April 2017.

Other entrants 
The following players received wildcards into the singles main draw:
  Bai Yan
  He Yecong
  Sun Fajing
  Xia Zihao

The following player received entry into the singles main draw using a protected ranking:
  Daniel Muñoz de la Nava

The following player received entry into the singles main draw as a special exempt:
  Oscar Otte

The following players received entry from the qualifying draw:
  Félix Auger-Aliassime
  Prajnesh Gunneswaran
  Juan Pablo Paz
  Gianluigi Quinzi

Women's singles main draw entrants

Seeds 

 1 Rankings as of 17 April 2017.

Other entrants 
The following players received wildcards into the singles main draw:
  Kang Jiaqi
  Pei Tingting
  Peng Shuai
  Yang Zhaoxuan

The following players received entry from the qualifying draw:
  Mana Ayukawa
  Nagi Hanatani
  Jessica Moore
  Sun Xuliu

The following player received entry into the singles main draw by a lucky loser:
  Gai Ao

Champions

Men's singles

 Janko Tipsarević def.  Quentin Halys 6–7(5–7), 6–3, 6–4.

Women's singles

 Zheng Saisai def.  Zarina Diyas, 7–5, 6–4

Men's doubles

 Dino Marcan /  Tristan-Samuel Weissborn def.  Steven de Waard /  Blaž Kavčič 5–7, 6–3, [10–7].

Women's doubles

 Han Xinyun /  Ye Qiuyu def.  Prarthana Thombare /  Xun Fangying, 6–2, 7–5

External links 
 2017 Kunming Open at ITFtennis.com

2017 in Chinese tennis
2017 ITF Women's Circuit
2017 ATP Challenger Tour
2017